Kaala Sona is a 1975 Hindi-language curry Western film produced by Harish Shah and Vinod Shah and directed by Ravikant Nagaich. The film stars Feroz Khan, Parveen Babi, Prem Chopra, Farida Jalal, Danny Denzongpa, Helen, Durga Khote, Keshto Mukherjee and Bhagwan. The film's music is by R. D. Burman and the lyrics by Majrooh Sultanpuri.

Plot 
Rakesh's life was turned upside down when his dad was murdered. The only consolation to be drawn by his passing was that the assailant was also killed. Years later, Rakesh finds out that his dad's killer is still alive, and the police have closed the murder file. He decides to avenge his father's death, travels to a far-off village, and befriends a young man named Shera. He finds out through Durga, whom he falls in love with, that his father's killer is Sardar Poppy Singh, who runs a vast underground business empire of growing and selling cocaine. Then Shera and Durga get the shocks of their lives when they find out that Rakesh has joined forces with Poppy, and has even killed a police officer to prove his loyalty. What led to Rakesh's sudden change of heart – from killing his father's assailant to becoming partners with him?

Cast 
Feroz Khan as Rakesh
Parveen Babi as Durga
Danny Denzongpa as Shera
Farida Jalal as Bela
Helen as Chameli
Prem Chopra as Poppy Singh
Narendra Nath - Hukam Singh
Bipin Gupta as Ranjeet Singh
Durga Khote as Mrs. Ranjeet Singh
Keshto Mukherjee as Drunkard
Master Bhagwan as Bartender
Seema Kapoor as Suzy
Agha
Raju Shrestha as Chandan
K. N. Singh as Police Commissioner
P. Jairaj as Rakesh's Father
Satyendra Kapoor as Police Officer
Krishnakant as Ram Das
Imtiaz Khan as Bahadur Singh

The film contains the hit song, sung by Danny Denzongpa himself with Asha Bhosle. The lyrics are "Sun Sun Kasam Se".

Soundtrack 
The music was written by R. D. Burman and the lyrics by Majrooh Sultanpuri. In a background music of whistling, R. D. Burman used his own tune of "Chala Jaata Hoon" from the 1972 film Mere Jeevan Saathi, which was also directed by Ravikant Nagaich. "Sun Sun Kasam Se" was a popular number and was the 2nd Hindi film song sung by Danny Denzongpa after the song "Mere Paas Aao" in the film Yeh Gulistan Hamara from the year 1972.

References

External links 
 

1975 films
Films scored by R. D. Burman
Indian Western (genre) films
1970s Hindi-language films
1975 Western (genre) films
Films directed by Ravikant Nagaich